Iver Fossum (born 15 July 1996) is a Norwegian professional footballer who plays as a midfielder for AaB.

Club career

Strømsgodset
Born and raised in Klokkarstua, Fossum started his career at the local club Huringen IF. After Fossum lost his father in a car accident when he was 14 years old in 2011, the Fossum-family moved to Drammen, to have the opportunity to fulfill their - Iver and his brother Emil Fossum - dreams of becoming professional football players. Soon after, he joined Strømsgodset.

In the same period, Iver Fossum made his debut for Strømsgodset's second team in the Norwegian 2. divisjon. At that time he was still only 14 years old, but seen as one of the country's greatest talents. Rosenborg BK offered him a contract, but Fossum continued in Strømsgodset, where he was promoted to the first team at the age of 16.

Fossum made his debut for Strømsgodset in the 2–1 win against Molde on 28 April 2013. He got his breakthrough in the 2014 season, when he gradually worked his way into the first team, featuring in 26 of the 30 league matches. In the 2015 season, he became the top scorer for his club, which finished second in 2015 Tippeligaen.

Hannover 96
Fossum signed a contract until June 2020 with Hannover 96 on 23 December 2015, in a deal worth 20 million NOK.

AaB
On 16 August 2019, Fossum signed with the Danish club AaB.

Career statistics

International

Scores and results list Norway's goal tally first, score column indicates score after each Fossum goal.

Honours
Strømsgodset
 Tippeligaen: 2013

Individual
Eliteserien Breakthrough of the Year: 2015

References

1996 births
Living people
Sportspeople from Drammen
Norwegian footballers
Association football midfielders
Norway international footballers
Norway under-21 international footballers
Strømsgodset Toppfotball players
Eliteserien players
Hannover 96 players
AaB Fodbold players
Bundesliga players
2. Bundesliga players
Danish Superliga players
Norwegian expatriate footballers
Norwegian expatriate sportspeople in Germany
Expatriate footballers in Germany
Norwegian expatriate sportspeople in Denmark
Expatriate men's footballers in Denmark